Brad Schneider (born 15 February 2001) is an Australian professional rugby league footballer who plays as a  for the Canberra Raiders in the NRL.

Background 
Schneider was born in Adelaide, South Australia and was raised in Townsville, Queensland, Australia.  Schneider is of German heritage.  

He played his junior rugby league for the Western Lions. 

He attended Kirwan State High School before being signed by the Canberra Raiders.

Playing career

Early career
In 2018, Schneider played for the Townsville Blackhawks in the Mal Meninga Cup. In 2019, he captained Kirwan State High in their NRL Schoolboy Cup final win over Westfields Sports High School. In October 2019, Schneider signed with the Canberra Raiders.

In 2020, Schneider was set to play for the Raiders' Jersey Flegg Cup team before the season was cancelled due to the COVID-19 pandemic.

2021
Schneider began the 2021 season playing for Canberra's NSW Cup team.

In Round 11 of the 2021 NRL season, Schneider made his first grade debut for Canberra against Melbourne.

References

External links 
Canberra Raiders profile

2001 births
Living people
Australian people of German descent
Australian rugby league players
Canberra Raiders players
Germany national rugby league team players
Rugby league halfbacks
Rugby league hookers
Rugby league players from South Australia